Pedicularia pacifica is a species of small predatory or ectoparasitic sea snail, a cowry-like marine gastropod mollusc in the family Ovulidae, the cowry allies.

These snails live on and feed on certain corals.

References

External links 
 Powell A. W. B., New Zealand Mollusca, William Collins Publishers Ltd, Auckland, New Zealand 1979 

Pediculariinae
Gastropods described in 1865
Taxa named by William Harper Pease